Chaudhry Chandu Lal Sundar Das was a Pakistani politician and lawyer who served as the 2nd Deputy Speaker of the Provincial Assembly of the Punjab between 1951 and 1955.

Das was to born into a Christian family.

References

Pakistani lawyers
Pakistani Christians
Deputy Speakers of the Provincial Assembly of the Punjab
Punjab, Pakistan MLAs 1951–1955
Possibly living people
Year of birth missing